

Wilhelm Meisel (4 November 1891 – 7 September 1974) was an Admiral of the Kriegsmarine of Nazi Germany during World War II and a recipient of the Knight's Cross of the Iron Cross.

Meisel was born in Zwickau and joined the Navy as a midshipman in 1913. He later served as a staff officer on Torpedo boats and was interned in Scapa Flow. After the scuttling of the High Seas Fleet he was held as a POW by the British and repatriated in 1921.

During World War II Meisel commanded a destroyer flotilla in the invasion of Poland of 1939 and was appointed commander of the heavy cruiser Admiral Hipper in 1940. He was made Chief of Staff of Naval Group west in 1943 and Chief of Naval staff in 1943.

Awards 
 Iron Cross (1914) 2nd Class (17 March 1915) & 1st Class (15 April 1917)
 Hanseatic Cross of Hamburg (June 1916)
 Albert Order of Saxony, 2nd Class with Swords (May 1916)
 The Honour Cross of the World War 1914/1918 (December 1934)
 Spanish Cross in Silver (6 June 1939)
 Clasp to the Iron Cross (1939) 2nd Class (26 October 1939) & 1st Class (8 May 1940)
 Destroyer War Badge (July 1941)
 High Seas Fleet Badge (1 November 1941)
 Knight's Cross of the Iron Cross on 26 February 1941 as Kapitän zur See and commander of the heavy cruiser "Admiral Hipper"
 Order of the Rising Sun, 2nd class (Japan)

References

Citations

Bibliography

 
 
 

1890s births
1974 deaths
People from Zwickau
Imperial German Navy personnel of World War I
Reichsmarine personnel
Admirals of the Kriegsmarine
Recipients of the clasp to the Iron Cross, 1st class
German military personnel of the Spanish Civil War
Recipients of the Knight's Cross of the Iron Cross
Recipients of the Order of the Rising Sun, 2nd class
German prisoners of war in World War II held by the United Kingdom
People from the Kingdom of Saxony
Military personnel from Saxony